Jansen AG is an internationally active family-owned company that develops, manufactures and distributes steel profile systems for windows, doors and facades as well as plastic products for the construction industry. 

As the exclusive licensee of Schüco in Switzerland and Liechtenstein, Jansen also offers architects and processors complete solutions made of aluminium. Jansen AG acquired its subsidiary RP Technik GmbH from the Welser Profile Group as of January 2021. With the acquisition of RP Technik, Jansen is focusing on product development and engineering and thus further expanding the innovation pipeline. As of April 2021, Jansen handed over its automotive supply business to Mubea. On 1.1.2022, the Rep Office for the Netherlands and Belgium was opened.

In the field of plastic solutions, the product portfolio includes systems for geothermal energy, building technology and piping systems. 

Jansen trains an average of around 50 apprentices in 10 different occupations. To date, the Jansen Group is 100% family-owned and employs around 600 people internationally.

References

External links

 Jansen AG
  

Manufacturing companies of Switzerland
Aluminium companies of Switzerland
Swiss companies established in 1923
Manufacturing companies established in 1923